Colonel Sir William Thomas Dupree, 1st Baronet,  (4 September 1856 – 2 March 1933) was an English brewer.

Dupree originally worked for the Reading-based H & G Simonds Brewery. In the early 1890s he became manager of the Simonds brewery in Portsmouth, where he resided for the rest of his life. He later left to set up his own business, Portsmouth United Breweries. It became extremely successful and by the late 1920s was one of the largest breweries in Southern England. In 1927, it took over the Rock Brewery in Brighton and was renamed Portsmouth and Brighton United Breweries Ltd, still with Dupree as chairman.

Dupree served in the 2nd Hampshire Artillery Volunteers, Territorial Force and Territorial Army as an artillery officer for over forty years. He was a justice of the peace and alderman in Portsmouth and served as mayor three times, in 1901–1902, 1902–1903, and 1909–1910. He was mayor during the coronation of King Edward VII and Queen Alexandra and entertained naval officers from sixteen countries, for which he was knighted in the 1902 Birthday Honours.

In the 1921 New Year Honours, he was created a baronet, largely due to his support for the Industrial League. He unsuccessfully contested Portsmouth Central for the Conservative Party in 1918 and was a Deputy Lieutenant of Hampshire.

References

1856 births
1933 deaths
English brewers
English justices of the peace
Mayors of Portsmouth
Knights Bachelor
Baronets in the Baronetage of the United Kingdom
Deputy Lieutenants of Hampshire
Royal Artillery officers
Conservative Party (UK) parliamentary candidates